Ragai Youssef (born 1932) is an Egyptian gymnast. He competed in eight events at the 1952 Summer Olympics.

References

1932 births
Living people
Egyptian male artistic gymnasts
Olympic gymnasts of Egypt
Gymnasts at the 1952 Summer Olympics
Place of birth missing (living people)